The following is a list of Acts of Parliament in the United Kingdom (and previously formally Great Britain during 1707–1800) concerning museums and galleries, in date order grouped by century:

18th century
British Museum Act 1753
British Museum Act 1767
Sale by Lottery of Sir Ashton Lever's Museum Act 1784

19th century
British Museum Act 1805
British Museum Act 1807
British Museum Act 1816
British Museum Act 1824
British Museum (No. 2) Act 1824
British Museum Act 1832
Museums Act 1845
National Gallery and Museums (Scotland) Act 1850
National Gallery of Ireland Act 1854
National Gallery of Ireland Act 1855
National Museum of Industry for Scotland and General Register House Act 1855
National Gallery Act 1856
Industrial Museum (Scotland) Act 1860
Sir J. Soane's Museum Act 1862
Dublin National Gallery Act 1865
National Gallery Enlargement Act 1866
National Gallery Enlargement Act 1867
London Museum Site Act 1868
Public Parks, Schools, and Museums Act 1871
National Gallery (Loan) Act 1883
Dublin Science and Art Museum Act 1884
National Portrait Gallery Act 1889
Museums and Gymnasiums Act 1891
British Museum (Purchase of Land) Act 1894

20th century
National Gallery (Purchase of Adjacent Land) Act 1901
British Museum Act 1902
National Galleries of Scotland Act 1906
National Gallery and St. James's Park Act 1911
Public Libraries (Art Galleries in County Boroughs) (Ireland) Act 1911
Royal Scottish Museum (Extension) Act 1912
Copyright (British Museum) Act 1915
Imperial War Museum Act 1920
National Maritime Museum Act 1934
National Gallery (Overseas Loans) Act 1935
Wellington Museum Act 1947
National Gallery and Tate Gallery Act 1954
National Museum of Antiquities of Scotland Act 1954
Imperial War Museum Act 1955
National Galleries of Scotland Act 1959
British Museum Act 1963
Public Libraries and Museums Act 1964
Museum of London Act 1965
Museums and Galleries Admission Charges Act 1972
National Theatre and Museum of London Act 1973
Museum of London Act 1986
National Maritime Museum Act 1989
Museums and Galleries Act 1992

21st century
none

See also
 British Museum Act

Museums
Lists of museums in the United Kingdom